Amar Roy Pradhan or Amarendra Nath Roy Pradhan (15 August 1930 – 3 July 2013) was an Indian politician from All India Forward Bloc party. He remained MP from Cooch Behar Lok Sabha constituency eight times from 1977 to 1999, prior to which he was member of West Bengal Legislative Assembly MLA from Mekhliganj thrice (1962–1971).

Early life and background
Amarendra Nath Roy Pradhan was born on 15 August 1930 to Talendranath Roy Pradhan at Barashashi, Dinajpur District (now in Bangladesh). He studied at Victoria College, Cooch Behar (then affiliated with University of Calcutta), followed by A.C. College, Jalpaiguri, West Bengal.

Career
Pradhan started his political career at state-level, and was elected to the West Bengal Legislative Assembly from Mekhliganj three times, 1962, 1967 and 1977.
 
He was elected to the Lok Sabha from Cooch Behar Lok Sabha constituency eight consecutive times from 1977 to 1999.

He also published a number of book, including Upeksit Uttarbange, Sona Sonapat, Garibi Hatao Ekti Slogan Matra (all in Bengali), and Forward towards Mighty Peasants Struggle, and Rule of Jungle (English).

Death
He died on 3 July 2013 at a nursing home in Jalpaiguri, at the age of 82. He was survived by two sons. His wife Santilata Roy Pradhan died prior to him. Arghya Roy Pradhan, his younger son, became a Trinamool Congress MLA in West Bengal state assembly from the Tufanganj constituency in 2011.

References

1930 births
2013 deaths
All India Forward Bloc politicians
People from Dinajpur District, Bangladesh
India MPs 1977–1979
India MPs 1980–1984
India MPs 1984–1989
India MPs 1989–1991
India MPs 1991–1996
India MPs 1996–1997
India MPs 1998–1999
India MPs 1999–2004
West Bengal MLAs 1962–1967
West Bengal MLAs 1967–1969
West Bengal MLAs 1969–1971
Lok Sabha members from West Bengal
People from Cooch Behar district